Matthew Jacob Kingsley (born July 11, 1986) is a former American professional basketball player, best known for his college career at Stephen F. Austin State University.

Kingsley, a 6'9" power forward, played one season at Cypress Creek High School in Houston, Texas. He was largely recruited by Division II and junior college programs. Danny Kaspar, head coach of Stephen F. Austin, suggested Kingsley walk-on to the team, before offering him a scholarship and having him redshirt his first year. During his career at Stephen F. Austin, Kingsley scored 1,504 points and was named to All-Southland Conference teams for three consecutive years.  As a senior in 2008–09, Kingsley averaged 15.8 points and 7.7 rebounds per game, earning Southland Conference Player of the Year and AP honorable mention All-American honors.

After not being selected in the 2009 NBA draft, Kingsley signed his first professional contract with BC Šiauliai in Lithuania.  He ended up playing for four teams in four countries during the 2009–10 season.  For 2010–11, Kinglsey signed with Bàsquet Mallorca, where he played until rupturing his Achilles tendon in December, 2010.  After recovering, he played the 2011–12 season with the Svendborg Rabbits in Denmark.

References

External links
 Stephen F. Austin profile

1986 births
Living people
American expatriate basketball people in Belgium
American expatriate basketball people in Denmark
American expatriate basketball people in Lithuania
American expatriate basketball people in Poland
American expatriate basketball people in Slovakia
American expatriate basketball people in Spain
American men's basketball players
Basketball players from Houston
Bàsquet Mallorca players
BC Šiauliai players
Polonia Warszawa (basketball) players
Power forwards (basketball)
RBC Pepinster players
Sportspeople from Beaumont, Texas
Stephen F. Austin Lumberjacks basketball players
Svendborg Rabbits players